Guanáca (Guanuco) is an extinct and scarcely attested language of Colombia.  It may have been related to Guambiano.

References

Languages of Colombia
Unclassified languages of South America